The Minister of the Interior was a powerful office in the Kingdom of Hawaii, the Provisional Government of Hawaii and the Republic of Hawaii from 1845 to 1900. It made up one of the four offices of the monarchical or presidential cabinet which advised the Head of State of Hawaii on executive affairs. During the monarchy, ministers were also ex-officio members of the Privy Council and the House of Nobles in the legislature. During the republic, ministers were ex-officio members of both houses of the legislature. The head of state had the power to appoint the ministers but later Hawaiian constitutions limited the power the head of state had in removing the cabinet ministers by requiring a vote of no confidence from a majority of the elective members of the legislature. All acts of the head of state had to be countersigned by a minister.

Ministers of the Interior

See also

Cabinet of the Kingdom of Hawaii
Other members of the Hawaiian Cabinet 
Ministry of Finance (Hawaii)
Ministry of Foreign Affairs (Hawaii)
Ministry of Public Instruction (Hawaii)
Attorney General of Hawaii

Sources

 
 
 

 
 
Hawaii